The men's middleweight (75 kg/165 lbs) Full-Contact category at the W.A.K.O. World Championships 2007 in Coimbra was the fifth heaviest of the male Full-Contact tournaments and one of the largest, involving twenty-six fighters from six continents (Europe, Asia, Africa, North America, South America and Oceania).  Each of the matches was three rounds of two minutes each and were fought under Full-Contact rules.

As there were not enough fighters for a tournament designed for thirty-two, six of the men received a bye through to the second round.  The tournament winner was Kazak Azamat Belgibaev who won gold by defeating Russian Manuchari Pipiya by split decision in the final.  Francesco Margiotta from Italy and Alpay Kir from Turkey both claimed bronze medals.

Results

Key

See also
List of WAKO Amateur World Championships
List of WAKO Amateur European Championships
List of male kickboxers

References

External links
 WAKO World Association of Kickboxing Organizations Official Site

Kickboxing events at the WAKO World Championships 2007 Coimbra
2007 in kickboxing
Kickboxing in Portugal